Baghak (also Romanized as Bāghak) is a village in Karian Rural District, in the Central District of Minab County, Hormozgan Province, Iran. At the 2006 census, its population was 64, in 15 families.

References 

Populated places in Minab County